Trade Your Way to the USA is a children's reality television gameshow that is presented by The Apprentice Series 1 runner-up Saira Khan. The show is about young traders aged between eleven and fourteen attempting to negotiate and haggle when buying in order to get the best deals when selling products.  A second series began on 23 April 2012. A third series began on CBBC at 4:30 on Monday 15 April 2013 and lasted 10 episodes.

Format
Fourteen teams are selected by the show's producers and proceed to the heats, where each team battles against another team to win a place in the semi-finals. The top four teams out of those winning each challenge then take on each other in two semi-finals. The winners of each semi-final will then go on to the grand final in New York. In series two the format is the same except for the final which is held in Dallas, Texas. In series 3 the format is the same except once again with the final held in Florida.

Series 1 (2011)

Episodes 

(All winners in Bold)
 Episode 1: Flowers (OAPs and Camphillian Traders)
 Episode 2: Medieval (The Three Profiteers and Impulse)
 Episode 3: Fruit (The Friendlee Traders and Sapphire)
 Episode 4: Cakes (Prosperity and MoneyTalks)
 Episode 5: Sovenirs (Aspire and New Minds)
 Episode 6: Toys (Trendz and Sky Limit)
 Episode 7: Cheese (The Determinators and Stylo)
 Episode 8: Fancy Dress (Sapphire and The Determinators )
 Episode 9: Balloons (Aspire and Prosperity)
 Episode 10: Final - Pretzels - New York (Sapphire and Aspire)

Series 2 (2012)

Episodes

(All winners in Bold)
 Episode 1: Magic Tricks - York (ARD and DNA)
 Episode 2: Ghoulish Souvenirs - Edinburgh (Team Adder and Unfinished Business)
 Episode 3: Ice Creams - Cornwall (3's company and Burning Money)
 Episode 4: Glow in the Dark Goods - Manchester (Street Smart Sellers and Carpe Diem)
 Episode 5: Circus Tricks - Blackpool ( Bargain Buckets and 3 Riskateers)
 Episode 6: Caribbean Smoothies - Derbyshire (Triple Traders and Team Synergy)
 Episode 7: Paw Print T-shirts - Derbyshire (Penny Pinchers and Destiny Hawks)
 Episode 8: Cupcakes - London (3's company and Street Smart Sellers)
 Episode 9: Chocolate - Brighton (Team Synergy and Penny Pinchers)
 Episode 10: Final - Cookies - Dallas, Texas (Street Smart Sellers and Team Synergy)

Series 3 (2013)

Episodes
(All winners in Bold)
 Episode 1: Fudge - Dumfries (Top Dogs and Treble Clef)
 Episode 2: Bath Bombs and Soaps - Bath (Cha-Ching and Sterling)
 Episode 3: Viking Balloons - York (Victores and Profiteroles)
 Episode 4: Sausages - Yorkshire ( Dominators and Team Hagglers)
 Episode 5: Children's Masks - London (New To The Business and Heads or Tails)
 Episode 6: Superhero Cookies - London ( Boundary Breakers and  Determination)
 Episode 7: Frozen Yogurt - Brighton ( Piggy Bankers and Trademark Traders)
 Episode 8: Popcorn - London (Determination and Top Dogs)
 Episode 9: Clown Props - Bognor Regis (Victores and Sterling)
 Episode 10 Final - Donuts - Florida (Top Dogs and Sterling)

External links

2011 British television series debuts
2013 British television series debuts
2010s British reality television series
2010s British children's television series